Euryxanthops orientalis is a species of crab found in Sagami Bay, Japan.

References

Crustaceans described in 1939
Xanthoidea